Julius Sizzer (1931) is an American two-reel short film directed by Edward Ludwig. According to film critic Nelson Bell, it was an "obvious travesty" of the serious gangster film Little Caesar released by Warner Bros. earlier that year.

Plot summary 
In this short, (Benny Rubin) plays a dual role of a man and his brother who have to dodge gangsters trying to put them on the spot.

Cast 
Benny Rubin
Gwen Lee
Lena Malena
Matthew Betz
Maurice Black
G. Pat Collins
Tom McGuire
Clifford Dempsey

References

External links 

1931 films
1931 comedy films
RKO Pictures short films
American black-and-white films
American comedy short films
1930s English-language films
1930s American films